Jean Wall (1900–1959) was a French stage and film actor. He also directed two films.

Partial filmography

 La vagabonde (1932) - Le peintre Adolphe Taillandy
 Chair ardente (1932) - Florent
 The Beautiful Sailor (1932) - Valentin
 Mariage à responsabilité limitée (1934) - Georges Lambert - l'amant
 We Are Not Children (1934) - Roger, l'ami
 L'ange gardien (1934) - L'imprésario
 Mauvaise Graine (1934) - Le zèbre
 Amants et voleurs (1935) - Gabriel
 The First Offence (1936) - The Zebra
 The Marriages of Mademoiselle Levy (1936) - Serge Wolff
 27 Rue de la Paix (1936) - Furet
 Compliments of Mister Flow (1936) - Pierre
 Trois... six... neuf (1937) - Fernand
 Woman of Malacca (1937) - Le major Carter
 Durand bijoutier (1938) - Tichmeyer
 La Loi du Nord (1939) - L'avocat général
 Alone in the Night (1945) - Marcheau
 Blind Desire (1945) - Robert Ancelot
 The Temptation of Barbizon (1946) - Le juge d'instruction
 L'ange qu'on m'a donné (1946) - Jules
 Le Bataillon du ciel (1947) - Ben Sassein
 The Beautiful Trip (1947) - Wallace
 Not Guilty (1947) - Le docteur Dumont
 The Lost Village (1947) - Tancraz
 Crossroads of Passion (1948) - Jean Claes
 Impeccable Henri (1948) - Gérard
 The King (1949) - Le Lorrain
 Ma pomme (1950) - Peuchat
 Bille de clown (1952) - Me Lemeunier
 It Happened in Paris (1952) - Hugo
 Rasputin (1954) - L'archimandrite Breham
 The Blue Danube (1955) - Premierminister Emser
 Frou-Frou (1955) - Jean Sabatier
 Elevator to the Gallows (1958) - Simon Carala
 Mon coquin de père (1958) - Roger Taloire
 The Possessors (1958) - Pierre Leroy
 Sunday Encounter (1958) - Saunier
 Oh! Qué mambo (1959) - Bob
 Secret professionnel (1959) - Le chirurgien-chef (final film role)

References

Bibliography
 Goble, Alan. The Complete Index to Literary Sources in Film. Walter de Gruyter, 1999.

External links

1900 births
1959 deaths
French male film actors
French male stage actors
Film directors from Paris